The Northern Ireland Transport Holding Company (NITHCo) is a government-owned body which was established in 1967 to take over the railway and bus services of the Ulster Transport Authority (UTA), namely Northern Ireland Railways (NIR) and Ulsterbus. The company was established by the Transport Act (Northern Ireland) 1967.

In 1973, Citybus took over the bus services of the Belfast Corporation Transport Department.

Between 1971 and 1994, NITHCo ran Belfast International Airport through its subsidiary Northern Ireland Airports Limited (NIAL). In 1994, the government created Belfast International Airport Ltd (BIAL), which was sold to Belfast International Airport Holdings Ltd, a management/employee buy-out vehicle.

In 1996, the Translink brand name was created to integrate the services of Ulsterbus, NIR, and Citybus.

External links
Translink web page

Road transport in Northern Ireland
Rail transport in Northern Ireland
Railway companies of the United Kingdom
Non-Departmental Public Bodies of the Northern Ireland Executive
Government-owned companies of Northern Ireland